Ricardo Hipólito López Murphy (born 10 August 1951) is an Argentine economist, academic and politician. He served as Minister of Defense and Minister of Economy during the presidency of Fernando de la Rúa. His time at the helm of the economy portfolio lasted only 15 days, as he was forced to leave office after announcing an unpopular austerity plan. Since 2021, he has been a National Deputy elected in Buenos Aires for the Juntos por el Cambio coalition.

He was chairman of Liberal Network for Latin America, an association of institutions to promote liberalism. Currently, he chairs the think tank Republican Civic Foundation.

Originally a member of the centrist Radical Civic Union (UCR), López Murphy describes himself ideologically as a republican liberal. Since 2020, he has chaired his own political party, United Republicans.

Early years

López Murphy was born in Adrogué, Buenos Aires Province of Basque and Irish descent. He was named Ricardo after Argentine politician Ricardo Balbín (who was his godfather) and Hipólito after radical president Hipólito Yrigoyen. He attended the National University of La Plata, where he was awarded the title degree in Economics, comprising four years of study in 1975. He then obtained a Master's degree in Economics from the University of Chicago in 1980.

Private sector
In his professional activity he worked as a consultant and economic advisor to companies, international investors and financial institutions in Argentina and Latin America. He was a consultant to the Inter-American Development Bank, World Bank, International Monetary Fund and chief economist of the Latin American Economic Research Foundation.

He received the Konex Prize in 1996.

Minister of Defense
In 1999, he entered politics when he was appointed Minister of Defense as a member of the Radical Civic Union (UCR). He remained in this position until 2001 when he briefly took the position of Minister of Economy in the government of Argentina.

Minister of Economy

Enjoying little political support from President, Fernando de la Rúa, he was fired within two weeks after a wave of protest over his proposed fiscal austerity project, by which he sought to prevent the 2001 economic crisis but which sharply cut education spending.

Politics
He founded a conservative liberal political party, Recreate for Growth (RECREAR), in 2002, and ran for the presidency in the April 2003 elections, finishing third behind Carlos Menem and Néstor Kirchner, with 16.3% of the popular vote. López Murphy won abroad. He was the favorite of the hundreds of Argentines who voted in the United States, Italy, Great Britain, Spain, Chile, Uruguay and Brazil.

He later teamed with Mauricio Macri in 2005 to create a new center-right coalition called Republican Proposal (PRO), which tacitly supported his unsuccessful second bid to the presidency in the 2007 presidential election. López Murphy did poorly, gaining just 1% of the vote; PRO, however, did somewhat better in provincial and congressional elections, and won the mayoral election in Buenos Aires that year.

He left RECREAR in April 2008, citing differences over party list strategy, and in December established Federal Convergency. He ran for Mayor of Buenos Aires in 2011 on this ticket, but obtained only 1.4% of the vote.

Personal life
López Murphy is married with three children.

López Murphy is often referred to in the media as "the Bulldog", a nickname he has come to embrace himself. He is described as an economist with a graduate degree from the University of Chicago, a militant Catholic and a fan of San Lorenzo de Almagro. He is against decriminalization of drug use, and abortion. He has called himself "an Alem and Alberdi liberal".

I follow the Argentine liberal tradition of [Juan Bautista] Alberdi, [Leandro] Alem and [Marcelo T.] Alvear. I am very proud of that. My ascription to liberal theories is not economic. That is a minor issue. I am part of a philosophical and moral tradition that has to do with defending the division of powers, controlling whoever exercises power, ensuring equality before the law and preventing someone from claiming the project of my happiness. With having the freedom and autonomy to decide my own future. I think it is very bad that the defense of liberal ideas is in charge of economists, because in general they start on the wrong side.

Electoral history

Executive

Legislative

References

External links

Bullblog
Corriente Convergencia Federal

1951 births
Living people
People from Adrogué
Argentine people of Basque descent
Argentine people of Irish descent
National University of La Plata alumni
Argentine economists
Argentine Ministers of Finance
Members of the Argentine Chamber of Deputies elected in Buenos Aires
Candidates for President of Argentina
Radical Civic Union politicians
Republican Proposal politicians
Recreate for Growth politicians
Defense ministers of Argentina
Articles containing video clips
Argentine anti-communists
Conservatism in Argentina